Dendermonde RC is a Belgian rugby union club currently competing in Belgian Elite League.

The club is based in Dendermonde in the Flemish Province of East Flanders. They are currently the only team from Flanders in the top flight. The official colours of the club are green and yellow.

History
The club was founded in 1962 under the name of SOS Rugby Sint-Gillis. The club's first game was against ASUB, resulting in a 13-20 loss.

Developing a strong youth following, the turn of the 1990s saw the club push on with the construction of its own complex in the Van Langenhovestraat region. and won its first Belgian League Title in 2012 having previously won the 2nd Division title twice in 1970 and 2010. Dendermonde won the Belgian double in 2011/12 breaking the domination of the Walloon and Brussels based teams.  In September 2017 Dendermonde became a global partner club of Leicester Tigers.

Honours
 Belgian Elite League
 Champions: 2012, 2016
 Belgian Second Division
 Champions: 1970, 2010
 Coupe de Belgique
 Champions: 2012, 2016

Season by Season

See also
 Rugby union in Belgium
 Belgian Elite League

References

External links
 Official site

Belgian rugby union clubs